The Turkish Naval Forces, or Turkish Navy is the naval warfare service branch of the Turkish Armed Forces.

The modern naval traditions and customs of the Turkish Navy can be traced back to 10 July 1920, when it was established as the Directorate of Naval Affairs during the Turkish War of Independence led by Mustafa Kemal Atatürk. Since July 1949, the service has been officially known as the Turkish Naval Forces.

In 2008, the Turkish Navy had a reported active personnel strength of 48,600; this figure included an Amphibious Marines Brigade as well as several Special Forces and Commando detachments. As of early 2021, the navy operates a wide variety of ships and 60 maritime aircraft.

History

Ottoman fleet after Mudros

Following the demise of the Ottoman Empire in the aftermath of World War I, on November 3, 1918, the fleet commander of the Ottoman Navy, rear admiral Arif Pasha, ordered all flags to be struck on all warships lying in the Golden Horn, and the Ottoman Navy ceased to exist. The major surface combatants of the former Ottoman fleet (totalling 62,000 tons) were rendered inactive by the Allies and in accordance with the terms of the Armistice of Mudros, the warships were disarmed during the last week of 1918. Due to its larger size, the battlecruiser  was transferred to the Gulf of Izmit on the grounds that she could adversely affect the sea traffic inside the Golden Horn; while her ammunition and guns were removed. During this period, only a small number of Ottoman Navy vessels were allowed by the Allies to remain on active coast guard duties and were released from internment on 26 February 1919; such as the torpedo boats Akhisar and Dıraç which patrolled the Sea of Marmara, the gunboat Hızır Reis which patrolled the Gulf of İzmir, and the minelayers  and Tir-i Müjgan which conducted mine cleaning operations in the Gulf of Saros.

Before the Turkish War of Independence began, the Bahriye Nazırlığı (Naval Ministry) sent the gunboat Preveze to Sinop and the gunboat Aydın Reis to Trabzon in February 1919 for surveillance, reconnaissance and patrol duties. However, a lack of coal to fuel their propulsion systems caused the Preveze and Aydın Reis to remain in harbour until the end of 1919. During the early stages of the Turkish War of Independence, these two gunboats did not return to Istanbul, despite heavy pressure from the Ottoman government and the Allies. Instead, they were placed under the command of the Turkish liberation forces led by Mustafa Kemal Atatürk and headquartered in Ankara.

Turkish War of Independence

Directorate of Naval Affairs
A large number of the naval officers and students of the Naval Academy went to Anatolia for participating in the Turkish War of Independence. On 10 July 1920, the Directorate of Naval Affairs (Umur-u Bahriye Müdürlüğü) was founded in Ankara under the Ministry of National Defense and was given the duty of organizing and maintaining strategic logistical shipping through the Black Sea in order to provide the Turkish liberation forces in Anatolia with weapons and other supplies. All existing naval institutions in the parts of Anatolia that were administered by the Ankara government were assigned to this Directorate. The Directorate of Naval Affairs was extremely successful in organizing local surface units and volunteers and in forming an intelligence network to discover the movements of the enemy ships. As a result, logistic transportation was carried out effectively. The Turkish Grand National Assembly in Ankara made an agreement with the Soviet Union to procure supplies for the Turkish liberation forces. Aydın Reis left from Samsun (on 16 September 1920) and Preveze left from Trabzon (on 30 September 1920) for Novorossiysk in order to transport weapons, other supplies and financial aid to the Turkish liberation forces. The Trabzon Shipping Detachment, which was founded on 21 September 1920, was renamed as the Trabzon Naval Shipping Command with the directive issued by the Ministry of National Defense on 26 October 1920. On January 1, 1921, the Samsun Naval Command was formed. In the subsequent stages of the Turkish War of Independence, due to the growing need for maritime shipping and the increase in the quantity and quality of the units and small ships, the organizational structure of the Directorate of Naval Affairs was gradually extended.

In the same period, a number of Turkish civilian seamen formed a group under the name of the Naval Aid Organization (Muavenet-i Bahriye). This group secretly obtained cannons, light weapons, ammunition, landmines and ordnance from the former Ottoman military warehouses in Istanbul that were under the control of the occupying Allies and sent them to the Turkish liberation forces in Anatolia with civil water transportation crafts.

Presidency of the Naval Department
On 1 March 1921, the Directorate of Naval Affairs was transformed into the Presidency of the Naval Department (Bahriye Dairesi Reisliği) and had control over the Naval Commands in Samsun, Amasra and İzmit (formed on 28 June 1921); the Naval Transport Detachment in Trabzon; the Naval Transport Command in Ereğli; the Naval Detachment in Lake Eğirdir; and the Naval Liaison Group in Fethiye (formed on 16 March 1921.) During the War of Independence, Turkish naval forces transported 220,000 tons of weapons, ammunition and equipment to the land forces in Anatolia.

Ministry of the Navy
Following the Armistice of Mudanya on 11 October 1922, the former Ottoman Ministry of the Navy (Bahriye Nazırlığı) building in the Kasımpaşa quarter of Istanbul, on the Golden Horn, became the headquarters of the Istanbul Naval Command on 14 November 1922. The establishment of the Ministry of the Navy (Bahriye Vekâleti) of the Republic of Turkey, headquartered in Ankara, was decided by the Grand National Assembly on 29 December 1924, and Topçu İhsan Bey (İhsan Eryavuz) was appointed the first (and only) Naval Minister of Turkey. When the Republic of Turkey was established on 29 October 1923, the former Ottoman vessels that remained under Turkish control were as follows:

In active service: 2 cruisers (Peyk-i Şevket), 2 yachts (Ertuğrul, Söğütlü), 1 destroyer (Taşoz), 4 gunboats (Burak Reis, Hızır Reis, Kemal Reis, İsa Reis), 1 minelayer, 1 aviso (Galata), 4 tugs and 7 motorboats.
Out of service (needing repair): 2 battleships, 2 cruisers (Berk-i Satvet), 4 destroyers (Nümune-i Hamiyet, Basra, Samsun), 6 torpedo boats (Yunus, Akhisar, Dıraç, Musul, Berk Efşan), 1 gunboat (Sakız).

Preparations were made to carry out the maintenance and overhaul of small-tonnage warships (the three Taşoz-class destroyers and the gunboats Burak Reis, Sakız, İsa Reis and Kemal Reis) and to make them combat-ready. Thus, the cruiser Hamidiye, which was planned to be employed as a Cadet Training Ship, was overhauled.

During the 1920s, a commitment to refurbish the battlecruiser  (which remained in active service until 1950) as the centerpiece of the republic's fleet was the only constant element of the various naval policies which were put forward. The battlecruiser remained in İzmit until 1926, in a neglected state: only two of her boilers worked, she could not steer or steam, and she still had two unrepaired scars from the mine damage in 1918. Enough money was raised to allow the purchase of a new  floating dock from the German company Flender, as Yavuz could not be towed anywhere without risk of her sinking in rough seas. The French company Atelier et Chantiers de St. Nazaire-Penhöet was contracted in December 1926 to oversee the subsequent refit, which was carried out by the Gölcük Naval Shipyard. Since the Treaty of Lausanne in 1923 required the disarmament of the Turkish Straits, the infrastructures belonging to the Turkish Naval Forces on the Bosphorus (in Istinye) and on the Golden Horn were transferred to Gölcük. In this period, Gölcük was designated as the main Turkish naval base.

The overhaul works of TCG Yavuz proceeded over three years (1927–1930); they were delayed when several compartments of the dock collapsed while being pumped out. Yavuz was slightly damaged before she could be refloated and the dock had to be repaired before the overhaul works could be resumed. The Minister of the Navy, İhsan Eryavuz, was convicted of embezzlement in the resulting investigation which became known as the Yavuz-Havuz case (havuz meaning "dock" in Turkish naval engineering terminology.) The investigation revealed that Ihsan Eryavuz had reduced the insurance obligation of the French company (Atelier et Chantiers de St. Nazaire-Penhöet) from 5 million to 1.5 million Turkish liras, and was convicted guilty of fraud, which resulted in the abolition of the Ministry of the Navy on 27 December 1927.

Undersecretariat of the Sea

Following the dissolution of the Ministry of the Navy, the naval forces were reorganized under the Ministry of National Defense and on 16 January 1928 the Undersecretariat of the Sea (Deniz Müsteşarlığı) was established in order to undertake the duties of the former Ministry of the Navy. With this new reorganization, the Turkish Fleet Command was put under the command of the Turkish General Staff in terms of administration and logistics. On 2 November 1930, the Naval War College (Deniz Harp Akademisi) commenced training and education of Staff Officers at its facilities in the Yıldız Palace. During World War II, the naval schools were temporarily relocated from Istanbul to Mersin for security reasons and conducted education and training activities in this city.

In 1933, with the approval of the Turkish Grand National Assembly, Gölcük was designated as the main base of the Turkish Navy. In the same year, the first new ship built at the Gölcük Naval Shipyard, the tanker TCG Gölcük, was laid down; and launched the following year. With the signing of the Montreaux Convention in 1936, Turkey's sovereignty over the Turkish Straits was internationally recognized, and Fortified Area Commands were founded on the Bosphorus and Dardanelles straits, with Naval Detachments assigned to these Commands.

Naval Forces Command

The Turkish Naval Forces were represented under the title of the Naval Undersecreteriat at the Turkish General Staff Headquarters in Ankara from 1928 to 1949. The historic decree of the Higher Military Council on 15 August 1949 led to the foundation of the Turkish Naval Forces Command (Deniz Kuvvetleri Komutanlığı.) After Turkey joined NATO on 18 February 1952, the Turkish Naval Forces were integrated into the organizational branches of the alliance.

Structure
In 1961, the Turkish Naval Forces Command was organized into four main subordinate commands: The Turkish Fleet Command, the Turkish Northern Sea Area Command, the Turkish Southern Sea Area Command and the Turkish Naval Training Command. In 1995, the Turkish Naval Training Command was renamed as the Turkish Naval Training and Education Command.

Current Structure 
Fleet Command, Gölcük Naval Base, Kocaeli
Surface Action Group Command, Gölcük Naval Base, Kocaeli
Northern Task Group Command, Gölcük Naval Base, Kocaeli
Western Task Group Command, Foça, İzmir
Southern Task Group Command, Aksaz, Muğla
Submarine Group Command, Gölcük Naval Base, Kocaeli
Fast Patrol Boat Group Command, İstanbul
Mine Warfare Group Command, Erdek Naval Base, Balıkesir
Logistic Support Group Command, Gölcük Naval Base, Kocaeli
Naval Aviation Group Command, Cengiz Topel Naval Air Station, Kocaeli
Gölcük Naval Base Command, Kocaeli
Gölcük Naval Shipyard Command, Kocaeli
Inventory Control Center Command, Kocaeli
Marine Supply Center Command, Kocaeli
Yıldızlar Surface Training Center, Gölcük, Kocaeli
Northern Sea Area Command, İstanbul
Istanbul Strait Command, Anadolukavağı, İstanbul
Çanakkale Strait Command, Nara, Çanakkale
Black Sea Area Command, Karadeniz Ereğli, Zonguldak
Underwater Search and Rescue Group Command, Beykoz, İstanbul
Rescue Group Command
Underwater Defence Group Command
 Naval Hydrography and Oceanography Division Command, Çubuklu, İstanbul
Bartın Naval Base Command, Bartın
Naval Museum Command, Beşiktaş, İstanbul
Istanbul Naval Shipyard Command, Pendik
Southern Sea Area Command, İzmir
Amphibious Task Group Command, Foça, İzmir
Amphibious Marine Brigade Command, Foça, İzmir
Amphibious Ships Command, Foça, İzmir
Aksaz Naval Base Command, Aksaz Naval Base, Marmaris
Mediterranean Area Command, Mersin
İskenderun Naval Base Command, İskenderun, Hatay
Agean Sea Area Command, İzmir
Foça Naval Base Command, Foça, İzmir
Maintenance, Repair and Engineering Command, İzmir
Naval Training and Education Command, İstanbul
Training Flotilla Commodore, Tuzla, İstanbul
Karamürselbey Training Center Command, Karamürsel, Kocaeli
Derince Training Center Command, Derince, Kocaeli

Marines and Special Forces 
The Turkish Navy maintains marine, explosive ordnance disposal and special operations units such as:

Amphibious Marine Brigade Command –, (Subordinate to Amphibious Task Group Command)
Underwater Defence Group Command –, (Subordinate to Rescue and Underwater Command)
Underwater Offence Group Command –, (Directly Subordinate to Naval Forces Operations Department)

Equipment

Ships and submarines

As of 2023 the navy operates a wide variety of ships, including; 1 Amphibious Assault Ship/Helicopter Carrier 16 frigates, 9 corvettes, 12 submarines, 18 missile boats, 16 patrol boats, 11 mine countermeasures vessels, 34 landing ships, and 37 auxiliary ships and boats. In 2023, the total displacement of the Turkish Navy is 292,310,5 tonnes.

Aircraft and Vehicles
The Turkish Navy operates a total of 83 aircraft, including 15 fixed-wing aircraft, 47 helicopters and 21 unmanned aerial vehicles.

Handguns

 Canik TP9

 Sarsılmaz SAR9
 Kılınç 2000 Light
 Zigana T
 Beretta 92FS
 Girsan Regard Compact
 Sig Sauer P226
 Glock 17

Submachine Guns

 HK MP5
 SAR 109T
 CZ Scorpion EVO 3

Shotguns

 Ithaca Model 37
 UTAS UTS-15

Sniper Rifles

 KNT-76
 SVD Dragunov
 Remington XM2010
 JNG-90
 Sig Sauer SSG3000
 Barrett M82
 Barrett M95

Machine Guns

 MG3
 FN Minimi 7.62 T.R.
 M249 SAW
 M2

Assault Rifles

 MKEK MPT-76
 MKEK MPT-55
 HK 33E
 HK G3
 AKM
 Colt M4
 Springfield M14

Grenade Launchers

 AK-40GL
 MKEK T-40
 M203
 Mark 19

Insignia

 Non-Turkish speakers might like to know that OF3, OF2, and OR2 literally translates as "Head of 1000", "Head of 100", and "Head of 10", respectively.

Future of the Turkish Navy
The Turkish Navy is currently undergoing several modernisation programmes to replace its ageing equipment. As of 2022, the major modernisation projects are as follows:

Ships & Submarines

Multi-purpose amphibious assault ship (LHD) project 

TCG Anadolu (L-400) amphibious assault ship / aircraft carrier is scheduled to enter service by 2021. The construction of a sister ship, to be named TCG Trakya, is currently being planned by the Turkish Navy 

TCG Anadolu, which will be the flagship when delivered to the Turkish Naval Forces, will also be the largest war platform in the history of the Turkish Navy. The amphibious assault ship is expected to host a fleet of Bayraktar TB3 unmanned aerial vehicles.

Bayraktar-class tank landing ship 
Two of the ships developed for the modern tank landing (LST) vessel requirement of the Turkish Navy successfully serve the Turkish Naval Forces. Bayraktar-class ships, largest LST ships in the world.
Planned to deliver 2 Bayraktar class LST ships to the Turkish Naval Forces in 2023-2024.

The ships have a large interior, the hospital, the fore and aft heavy load ramps, the ramp that provides access to the upper deck, the capacity of carrying 400 amphibious personnel, the ability to drop and collect mines, 4 LCVP extraction vehicles that can move from the ship.

TF-2000-class air defense destroyer 
A total of 15 ships of three types (Corvette (Ada Class), Frigate (I Class) and Destroyer (TF-2000 Class)) will be built within the scope of the National Ship (MILGEM) project, which aims to meet the warship needs of the Turkish Navy through national means. The first four ships built within this scope, the corvettes TCG Heybeliada (F-511), TCG Büyükada (F-512), TCG Burgazada (F-513) and TCG Kınalıada (F-514), have been delivered to the Naval Forces Command.

The design activities of the TF-2000 class AAW destroyer, the last phase of the MILGEM Project, was started by the Design Project Office (DPO) of the Turkish Navy in 2017. Initially four ships will be built, with the option to build up to eight in total. The first TF-2000 class destroyer is planned to be delivered to the Turkish Navy in 2027.

Istanbul-class frigate 

The I-class Frigate Program was launched to construct four frigates to replace the aging Yavuz-class Frigates in the mid-2020s. Developed under the MILGEM indigenous warship program, the Istanbul-class is an enlarged variant of the Ada-class anti-submarine warfare corvette. The I-class Frigates will have around 50% increased fuel capacity and operational range capability compared to the Ada-class corvettes.

The first Istanbul-class frigate  [tr] was launched on 23 January 2021. It is expected that the acceptance tests will be completed in January 2023 and the ship will be delivered in September 2023.

Barbaros-class frigate modernization 

With the Barbaros Class Frigate Half-Life Modernization Project, which has been going on for a long time, it is aimed to remove the existing combat systems of four Barbaros Class Frigates registered in the inventory of the Naval Forces Command, and to equip them with systems developed locally and nationally by the Aselsan-Havelsan consortium in accordance with the requirements of the era.

It is planned that the modernization of the first ship to be equipped with domestic systems will be completed in February 2022 and the ship will be put into service.

Reis-class submarine 

The Type 214 class vessels are regarded as a first for the Turkish Navy due to its air-independent propulsion technology made possible  by fuel cell technology. The vessels also can deploy heavyweight torpedoes and anti-ship missiles and lay mines against targets, both at sea and on the ground, Turkish media reported.
Apart from Piri Reis, five more vessels of the project are expected to hit the seas by 2027. As Piri Reis was deployed to the sea, the project's second submarine Hızırreis’ outfitting and two vessels’ hull production phases are ongoing.
In 2015, Golcuk Naval Shipyard commenced a 10 year programme to build 6 Type 214, locally known as Reis class submarines with technology from Thyssenkrupp Marine Systems of Germany.

Preveze-class submarine modernization 
Half-life Modernisation Project of Preveze Class Submarines covers the modernisation of TCG Preveze (S-353), TCG Sakarya (S-354), TCG 18 Mart (S-355) and TCG Anafartalar (S-356) submarines in the inventory of the Naval Forces Command. Modernisation activities are carried out by STM-ASELSAN-HAVELSAN and ASFAT Partnership.

In the modernisation process, it is planned to carry out the procurement activities of Inertial Navigation System, Salinity-Depth-Density Measurement System, Floating Antenna, Satellite Communication Mast, Assault and Navigation Periscope System, Emergency Underwater Communication System, Cooled Water System, Static Converter and Air Freshening System by STM.

USVs

ULAQ Armed USV 
ULAQ is the first indigenous and locally developed Armed Unmanned Surface Vehicle (AUSV). The vehicle is being developed by a joint venture between Ares Shipyard and METEKSAN. The vessel is planned to be equipped with four Cirit and two L-UMTAS anti-tank missile systems provided by Roketsan. Moreover, ULAQ is projected to have a 400-kilometer-long cruising range with 65 km per hour maximum speed. The vessel is planned to be operated in missions such as reconnaissance, surveillance and intelligence, surface warfare, asymmetric warfare, armed escort and force protection, and strategic facility security. Currently, the project is undergoing sea trials and will start to fire tests through the third quarter of 2021. First firing test of the vessel was completed on 26 May 2021 by destroying a designated target with Roketsan Cirit Missile.

Aircraft, UAVs & UCAVs

Baykar MIUS Kızılelma UCAV 

Baykar MIUS Kızılelma is a jet-engined UCAV designed to operate on TCG Anadolu. Its maiden flight was successfully completed on December 14, 2022.

Bayraktar TB3 UCAV 
In February 2021, chairman of the Presidency of Defense Industries (SSB) Ismail Demir made public a new type of UAV being developed by Baykar that is planned to be stationed to Turkey's first amphibious assault ship, TCG Anadolu. The new aircraft being developed is a naval version of the Bayraktar TB2 equipped with a local engine developed by TEI. According to the initial plans the ship was expected to be equipped with F-35B fighter jets but following the removal of Turkey from the procurement program, the vessel got into a modification process to be able to accommodate UAVs. Mr. Demir stated that between 30 and 50 folding-winged Bayraktar TB3 UAVs will be able to land and take off using the deck of Anadolu.

Istanbul Naval Museum 
The Istanbul Naval Museum is located in the Beşiktaş district of Istanbul, Turkey. It was established in 1897 by the Ottoman Minister of the Navy (Bahriye Nazırı) Bozcaadalı Hasan Hüsnü Pasha.

The museum contains an important collection of military artifacts pertaining to the Ottoman Navy. In the maritime field, it is Turkey's largest museum, with a great variety of collections. Around 20,000 pieces are present in its collection, including the late 16th or early 17th century Ottoman Navy galley known as Tarihi Kadırga, built in the period between the reigns of Sultan Murad III (1574–1595) and Sultan Mehmed IV (1648–1687), as evidenced by AMS radiocarbon dating and dendrochronological research. She is the only surviving original galley in the world, and has the world's oldest continuously maintained wooden hull.

Being connected to the Turkish Naval Forces Command, it is also the country's first military museum.

In the early 21st century a new exhibition building was constructed. The construction began in 2008, and the building was reopened on October 4, 2013. It has two floors above ground level and one basement floor, all covering .

The basement consists of diverse items like figureheads, ornaments of naval ships, ship models, and pieces of the Byzantine chain that was used for blocking the entrance of the Golden Horn during the Ottoman conquest of Constantinople (Istanbul) in 1453. In the first and second floors, a large number of imperial and other caïques are exhibited.

Many exhibition items underwent special restoration and conservation works due to deformation of the raw materials caused by heat, light, humidity, atmospheric conditions, vandalism and other factors.

See also
 Turkish Armed Forces
 Turkish Land Forces
 Turkish Air Force
 Lists of ships of the Turkish Navy
 Ottoman Navy
 List of Commanders of the Turkish Naval Forces

Notes

References

External links

 Turkish Navy – Official website
 Turkish Naval Museum – Official website
 Serhat Guvenc, "Building a Republican Navy in Turkey: 1924-1939", International Journal of Naval History
 Undersecretariat for Defence Industries

 
Military units and formations established in 1920

he:היסטוריה של הצי העות'מאני